Alberto Picchi (born 12 August 1997) is an Italian footballer who plays as a midfielder for  club Siena.

Club career
He made his professional debut in Serie B for SPAL on 17 December 2016 in a game against Pro Vercelli.

On 21 August 2019, he signed with Arezzo.

On 26 August 2021, he joined Lucchese on a one-year deal.

On 1 September 2022, Picchi signed a multi-year contract with Siena.

International career
He represented the Italy national under-19 team at the 2016 UEFA European Under-19 Championship, where Italy were runners-up.

References

External links
 

1997 births
Living people
Sportspeople from Livorno
Footballers from Tuscany
Italian footballers
Association football midfielders
Serie B players
Serie C players
Empoli F.C. players
S.P.A.L. players
U.S. Pistoiese 1921 players
U.S. Cremonese players
S.S. Arezzo players
Lucchese 1905 players
A.C.N. Siena 1904 players
Italy youth international footballers